Barghouti (other spellings Barghuthi, Barghouthi, or Al-Barghuthi) (classical Arabic:  al-Barghūthī) is the surname of a prominent Palestinian family. Many members are involved in Palestinian politics and mainly come from Ramallah and al-Bireh Governorate's most prominent towns of Deir Ghassanah, Aboud, Kobar and Bani Zeid.

List of notable members
Abd al-Jabir al-Barghouti, Palestinian  commander of the Bani Zeid during the Peasants' revolt in Palestine
Abd Allatif Barghouti  (1928–2002), Palestinian writer and poet
Abdullah Barghouti (born 1979), Palestinian leading commander in Hamas' armed wing Izz ad-Din al-Qassam Brigades
Bashir Barghouti (1931–2000), Palestinian communist and journalist
Hussein Barghouti (1954–2002), Palestinian poet
Imad Barghouthi (born 1962), Palestinian astrophysicist and public figure, subject to several administrative detentions in Israeli prisons for his political statements, as well as one arrest by the Palestinian Authority.
Marwan Barghouti (born 1958), Palestinian leader of Fatah, jailed by Israel during the Second Intifada
Mohammad Barghouti, Palestinian former labour minister of the Palestinian Authority
Mourid Barghouti (born 1944-2021), Palestinian poet and writer
Mustafa Barghouti (born 1954), Palestinian medical doctor and one state solution activist
Omar Barghouti (born 1964), Palestinian activist and co-founder of the BDS movement
Tamim al-Barghouti (born 1977), Palestinian poet and political scientist, son of Mourid Barghouti.

References

Arabic-language surnames
Palestinian families
Palestinian Muslims
People from Bani Zeid